The King of Love (Sicilian: Lu Re d'Amuri) is an Italian fairy tale from Sicily collected by Giuseppe Pitre and translated into English by Thomas Frederick Crane in Italian Popular Tales.

It is Aarne-Thompson-Uther tale type 425B, "Son of the Witch", thus distantly related to the Graeco-Roman myth of Cupid and Psyche, and belongs to the international cycle of the Animal as Bridegroom or The Search for the Lost Husband.

Synopsis

One day he took his youngest daughter, Rosella, with him, and she pulled up a radish. A Turk appeared and said she must come to his master and be punished. He brought them underground, where a green bird appeared, washed in milk, and became a man. The Turk told what had happened. The father said that there was no sign that the radish had belonged to him. The man married Rosella and gave her father a sack of gold. One day, while the man was away, her sisters visited her. She told them that her husband had forbidden her to ask who he was, but they persuaded her to ask his name. He told her that he was the King of Love and vanished.

She wandered in search of him, calling for him, and an ogress appeared, demanding to know why Rosella called on her nephew.  The ogress took pity on her and let her stay the night, telling her that she was one of seven sister ogresses, and the worst was her mother-in-law.  Each day, Rosella met another; on the seventh day, a sister of the King of Love told Rosella to climb her hair into the house while their mother was out.  Then she and her sisters told Rosella to seize their mother and pinch her until the ogress cried out to be left alone in her son's name.

Rosella did this, and the ogress wanted to eat her, but the ogress's daughters stopped her.  Then she insisted that Rosella carry a letter for her.  In the wilderness, Rosella called on the King of Love again.  He warned her to flatter things along the way:  to drink from and praise two rivers, to eat and praise fruit from an orchard, to eat bread from an oven and praise it, to feed two dogs, to sweep a hall, and to polish a knife, razor and scissors.  Then she was to deliver the letter, seize a box from the table, and run.  When she did this, the ogress called after her for things to destroy her, but they refused because of her kindness.  Curious, she opened the box; musical instruments escaped, and she had to call on her husband again to get them back.

The ogress wanted to eat Rosella again but her daughters stopped her again.  She ordered her to fill a mattress with feathers from all the birds in the air.  The King of Love got the King of Birds to have the birds fill the mattress. Then the ogress married her son to the daughter of the King of Portugal, and had Rosella hold the torches for the bridal chamber; but the king got his bride to switch places with Rosella, and the ground opened up and swallowed the bride.

The ogress declared that Rosella's child would not be born until she unclasped her hands.  The King of Love had his body laid out as if he were dead, and his sisters lamented him.  The ogress unclasped her hands, demanding to know how he had died.  Rosella's son was born.  This so enraged the ogress that she died.

Commentary
Folktale collector Thomas Frederick Crane described thus the format that would later be classified in the Aarne-Thompson-Uther Index as tale type ATU 425A, "The Animal as Bridegroom":

However, some tales also involve the heroine performing difficult tasks for her husband's family (more specifically, her mother-in-law), a type classified as ATU 425B, "The Son of the Witch" or "The Witch's Tasks".

This form of startling the mother-in-law into allowing the baby's birth is found in Italian fairy tales; usually it is done by announcing the birth.  In English and Scandinavian ballads, such as Willie's Lady, the mother-in-law must be startled so that she will accidentally reveal the charms she is using against the birth.

Variants
In a variant collected by Domenico Comparetti from Basilicata with the title Filo d'Oro, a poor shoemaker has an only daughter. Her mother sends her to the garden to find cabbages for their soup, but she pushes a bush and leaves a golden coin to compensate for the lost herb. Suddenly, a handsome youth appears out of the ground and asks the girl to accompany him to an underground place. The youth says he was cursed by his mother to be seen by only one woman, for his mother, an ogress, was told of the fairy's prophecy about his future betrothed: the shoemaker's daughter. The girl returns home, tells her family everything and her mother wants to see this youth. The next day, when the girl pushes the herb and leaves the coin, the mother hides behind a tree to see Filo d'Oro. Nothing happens, so the mother throws a nut and the man appears. He scolds his beloved and disappears. The girl goes on a journey to seek him, and rests by a tree. She overhears two birds talking that Filo d'Oro is dead, but if one can kill the birds, burn their ashes and mingle with Filo d'Oro's, can resurrect him. She meets the fairies who prophesied Filo d'Oro's future and give her a fig to use on his ogress mother. The girl finds the ogress mother and makes her swear on her son's soul. The ogress learns she is her daughter-in-law, takes the birds's ashes and resurrects her son. She locks him up and forces the girl to do some tasks: to fulfill mattresses with bird feather and to get a box with instruments from the ogress's sister. Unbeknownst to the girl, her beloved Filo d'Oro helps her on both occasions. She learns Filo d'Oro is safe and sound, but that she is to hold some candles on the wedding his mother set for him. When midnight strikes, the false bride is swallowed by the earth and the lovers escape, thinking it is their victory, but the ogress curses her daughter-in-law to die in childbirth - revertible only if the ogress puts both hands on her head. As a last trick on her mother-in-law, the girl fakes that she is in mourning, returns to the ogress's house and tells her her son is dead again. The ogress mother puts both hands on her head, thus breaking the curse. Author Italo Calvino adapted the tale as Filo d'Oro and Filomena and remarked that it was related to "Amor and Psyche" cycle of stories.

In another tale collected by Pitrè, Spiccatamunnu, the heroine, Rusidda, marries a mysterious man. Incited by her sisters, Rusidda makes the only mistake she should not have made: she asks her husband's name. As soon as he answers "Spiccatamunnu", their splendid palace disappears and she is now alone. Rusidda arrives at an ogress's house, her mother-in-law. She sends her to get a casket from her sister. The girl gets the casket and, on the way, opens it to satisfy her curiosity: an army of little dolls jump out of the box and begin to dance. Rusidda tries to contain them and put them back in the box, to no avail. Suddenly, her husband Spiccatamunnu throws her a cane and instructs her to beat it on the ground, and the little dolls will return to the box. It just so happens. After she gives the casket to her mother-in-law, the ogress announces that her son is to be married to another person, and orders Rusidda to hold a torch by their bridal bed, in a kneeling position. Spiccatamunnu's new fiancée, seeing Rusidda's suffering, takes pity on the girl and takes her place holding the torch. Outside, the ogress mother commands the ground to open up and swallow whoever is holding up the torch.

See also

Graciosa and Percinet
The Green Serpent
Ulv Kongesøn (Prince Wolf)
The Golden Root
The Horse-Devil and the Witch
 Khastakhumar and Bibinagar
 Habrmani
 The Son of the Ogress
 Yasmin and the Serpent Prince
 Prunella
 The Little Girl Sold with the Pears
 La Fada Morgana
The Enchanted Canary
The Magic Swan Geese
The Witch
The Old Witch

References

King of Love
Love
ATU 400-459
Thomas Frederick Crane